Miranda Bennett (born 1 September 1979 in Bordertown, South Australia) is an Australian former rower – a three-time world champion.

Club and state rowing
Bennett senior rowing was done from the Torrens Rowing Club in Adelaide.

Bennett contested the national lightweight double sculls title at the Australian Rowing Championships from 1999. She won that championship in 2000.

Bennett was first selected to represent South Australia in the women's Interstate Youth Eight Championship contesting the Bicentennial Cup at the 1999 Australian Rowing Championships. She then raced in South Australian representative crews who contested the Victoria Cup at the Interstate Regatta successively from 2000 to 2004 and then from 2006 to 2008. Those champion South Australian quads stroked by Amber Halliday or Marguerite Houston were victorious in this event in 2000, 2002, 2003, 2004, 2007 & 2008.

International representative rowing
Bennett made her Australian representative debut at the 2000 Nations Cup in Copenhagen, Denmark – the equivalent of today's World Rowing U23 Championships. She placed fifth in a lightweight double scull with her South Australian teammate Megan Campbell  

Bennett raced at both World Rowing Cups in Europe in 2001 in a double scull but Australian didn't qualify the double to the World Championships that year. Bennett was the reserve for the Australian lightweight quad scull (rowed by three of her South Australian team-mates) who won a World Championship title at Lucerne 2001.

She broke into the Australian lightweight quad to race at the 2002 World Rowing Cup II in Lucerne, Switzerland and in that same crew made her first World Championship appearance in the lightweight quad scull to contest the 2002 World Rowing Championships in Seville. In a crew with Zita van de Walle, Marguerite Houston and Hannah Every-Hall, Bennet won the gold, her first World Championship title and set a new world record in the process.

The following year at Milan 2003 with Bronwen Watson and Sally Newmarch as new additions to the quad and Houston in the three seat, Bennett stroked the boat to World Championship bronze.

Missing Olympic selection in 2004 – where Newmarch and Amber Halliday rowed the lightweight double – Bennett was back rowing at the highest national level from 2006. She was again selected in the lightweight quad for the 2007 World Rowing Championships in Munich. Seated at two with Watson, Alice McNamara, and Tara Kelly they won their heat and lead the final from the 500 m mark to claim the gold and Bennett's second World Championships title.

Halliday and Houston were selected to row the lightweight double at 2008 Summer Olympics and for the 2008 World Lightweight Championships in Linz Austria, Bennett's 2007 quad stayed together with Kelly changed-out for Tasmanian Ingrid Fenger. Bennett was in the three seat for their thrilling victory. At the 500 m mark the Australians sat in fourth place behind Poland, the United States and Great Britain. They lifted their rate in the middle half and moved ahead of the American and British crews and turned their attention to chasing down the Poles who held a one and a half second lead at the halfway mark. In the final 500 m Australia surged past Poland and stormed to the line to take the gold medal in a time of 6:36.41, almost three seconds clear of Poland. This was Bennett's third World Championship title and a fitting end to her representative career.

References

External links
 

1979 births
Living people
Australian female rowers
World Rowing Championships medalists for Australia
21st-century Australian women